Es la Nostalgia (English It's the nostalgia) is the 12th studio album by Mexican pop singer Daniela Romo. It was released in 2005.

History
The project followed the luck of its predecessor Ave Fénix since it was largely ignored because Daniela was busy in telenovelas. This time Daniela returns to her roots of romantic ballads under the supervision of Adrián Posse and Tina Galindo, she also count on famous Spanish songwriters like Rudy Pérez with the song "Sería Fácil" (It'd be easy) and the Argentinian singer Jairo with the songs "Es la nostalgia" and its French version "Quand un oiseau pleure" (When a bird cries), the facility of Daniela to pronounce French made this song to be selected to be part of an album of various French singers like Édith Piaf, Gilbert Bécaud, Charles Trenet, among others, being Daniela the only non-native French speaker.

Track listing
Tracks:
 Simple
 Debilidad
 Sería fácil
 Cuando tú me amas
 Oración
 Mañana será igual
 Qué voy a hacer sin ti
 Amar de este modo
 No supe vivir sin ti
 Para tocar el cielo
 Es la nostalgia
 Quand un oiseau pleure

Singles
 Sería fácil
 Simple
 Debilidad
 Es la nostalgia

Credits
 Nico Garibotti → Production Assistant
 Joel Numa → Mixing
 Robin Reinfried → Engineer
 Bruce Weeden → Mastering

References

2005 albums
Daniela Romo albums